The 2010 Skyrunner World Series was the 9th edition of the global skyrunning competition, Skyrunner World Series, organised by the International Skyrunning Federation from 2002. 

Same format of the seasons 2008 and 2009.

Results
The series has developed in 14 races from May to September.

Standings
Scoring system

The champions based on the sum of the best three World Series’ race results and one World Series Trial.

Men

Women

References

External links
 Skyrunner World Series

2010